Sphenophryne brevicrus is a species of frog in the family Microhylidae.
It is endemic to West Papua, Indonesia.
Its natural habitat is subtropical or tropical moist montane forests.

Names
It is known as kabanm in the Kalam language of Papua New Guinea, a name that is sometimes also applied to mature Cophixalus parkeri and Nyctimystes sp.

References

Sphenophryne
Amphibians of Western New Guinea
Taxa named by Pieter Nicolaas van Kampen
Taxonomy articles created by Polbot
Amphibians described in 1913